Larry Kahaner is an American journalist, author, ghostwriter and former licensed private investigator. He was born in Brooklyn, New York and now lives in Bethesda, Maryland.

His books include: 
Competitive Intelligence (Simon & Schuster), 
AK-47: The Weapon that Changed the Face of War (Wiley), 
Values, Prosperity and the Talmud (Wiley), 
Cults That Kill (Warner Books), 
On The Line (Warner Books), 
USA, Inc. (Bay City Publishers), 

He has received the Jesse M. Neal National Business Journalism Award,

the American Society of Business Publication Editors Regional Gold Award 

and an Associated Press Newswriting Award. He holds a Master of Science in journalism from Boston University. 
A former BusinessWeek Correspondent, his work has appeared in the Washington Post,

Los Angeles Times 
and Information Week.

	As a reporter for the Columbus (GA) Ledger-Enquirer in 1980, he wrote the first in-depth exposé of the textile mills in the city and how they caused byssinosis, also known as 'brown lung disease,' in workers. Byssinosis is caused by inhaling textile particles. For years, workers were reluctant to complain about the illness for fear of losing their jobs. The mills exerted great economic power including owing an adjoining town, Bibb City, owned by Bibb Manufacturing Company. When the series was released, many of the newspaper's street boxes were looted of their copies. The series led to the Georgia legislature enacting laws to allow workers with byssinosis to file workers' compensation claims for the first time. The reportage also garnered several awards including an Associated Press Newswriting Award – Public Service. 

Kahaner arguably wrote the first, nationally-syndicated newspaper articles about frequent incidents of sexual harassment of female soldiers at Fort Benning at a time when Pentagon officials said that such cases were rarely reported or brushed aside.

	During the early to mid 1980s, Kahaner covered the telecommunications industry as it underwent a massive change from a regulated business, dominated by AT&T, to a deregulated industry that brought in new players and new technologies. As a founding editor of Communications Daily and later as a Washington correspondent for Business Week, in addition to freelancing for other magazines and newspapers, he wrote some of the earliest articles about the new telecommunications landscape,
cell phones, email,
and the internet, 

culminating in two books, "The Phone Book," with co-author Alan Green (Penguin, 1983) and "On the Line: The Men of MCI – Who Took on AT&T, Risked Everything and Won"  (Warner Books, 1986).

	During the 1990s and into the 2000s, Kahaner has been a regular contributor to Fleet Owner, a transportation and logistics print magazine and online publication. First, he wrote a monthly column about Washington politics, as well as other stories, and later in 2015 began writing a twice-a-month article about the lives of truck drivers. He has called attention to their day-to-day struggles,

health,

safety,

working conditions 

public perceptions

and personal lives. 

In a 2006 interview with Michael Yon On Line Magazine Kahaner said: "I know this sounds corny but I would like to be remembered for something in my writing that helped someone or advanced a righteous cause. For example, when I was a reporter at the Columbus Ledger-Enquirer in Columbus, Georgia stories I did about brown lung disease –which you get from working in textile mills –helped change state legislation to protect workers. In another instance, I wrote about MCI 'On the Line' and how it beat rival AT&T. It was a David and Goliath story. This inspired a woman in the midwest to start her own business. It’s too early to tell if there will be any impact from my current book 'AK-47: The Weapon that Changed the Face of War,' but I hope that it will help people to see that there are too many military-style weapons in the wrong hands and it keeps wars going in the world’s poorest countries. I have no problem with gun ownership, but I have a problem with large-scale gun dealers who sell guns to anyone just to make money. It’s a crime on many levels."

Partly drawing on his experience after college as a technician on an oceanographic vessel that surveyed Massachusetts Bay (The RV Atlantic Twin) Kahaner has authored a thriller "USA, Inc." which was published by Bay City Publishers in December, 2016.
Aside from recently-published humor pieces in The Haven 

and Extra Newsfeed,

 Kahaner is currently researching a novel that takes place in Scotland.

References

External links
Author Website

Journalists from New York City
Writers from Brooklyn
Living people
Year of birth missing (living people)